Anthony Wong may refer to:

Anthony Brandon Wong  (born 1965), Australian actor
Anthony Wong (Hong Kong actor) (born 1961), Hong Kong actor, screenwriter and film director
Anthony Wong Yiu-ming (born 1962), Hong Kong singer, composer and producer

See also
Tony Wong (disambiguation)